Janusz Batugowski (2 February 1948 – September 2022) was a Polish football player and manager, best known for managing KSZO Ostrowiec Świętokrzyski in the Ekstraklasa.

References

1948 births
2022 deaths
People from Opatów
Polish footballers
Association football defenders
Błękitni Kielce players
Polish football managers
KSZO Ostrowiec Świętokrzyski managers
Józef Piłsudski University of Physical Education in Warsaw alumni